Danielle Girard is an American author, best known for her novel Chasing Darkness, and the two fiction series, Rookie Club and Dr. Schwartzman. She primarily writes in the suspense and romance genres.

Girard has won two awards for her work: a 2003 Barry Award for Cold Silence, and Chasing Darkness won a Romantic Times Reviewers' Choice Award.

Bibliography

The Rookie Club series 

 Dead Center (2006)
 One Clean Shot (2012)
 Dark Passage (2013)
 Grave Danger (2014)
 Everything to Lose (2015)
 Too Close to Home: A Rookie Club Short Story

Dr. Schwartzman series 

 Exhume (2016)
 Excise (2017)
 Expose (2018)
 Expire (2019)

Badlands Thriller series 

 White Out (2020)
 Far Gone (June 2021)

Other Works 

 Savage Art (2000)
 Ruthless Game (2001)
 Chasing Darkness (2002)
 Cold Silence (2002)

References

External links
 Girard's Official Website

1970 births
Living people
21st-century American novelists
American women novelists
American thriller writers
Barry Award winners
21st-century American women writers
Women thriller writers